Lady Forbes was launched at Leith in 1799. She became a West Indiaman, sailing under a series of letters of marque. She survived a major hurricane and an attack by pirates. From 1819, she was a whaler in the British northern whale fishery. She made three annual whaling voyages before she was lost in 1822 when ice crushed her.

Career
Lady Forbes first appeared in Lloyd's Register (LR) in 1799.

Captain David Gourlay acquired a letter of marque on 25 December 1799. After the resumption of war with France he acquired a new letter of marque on 21 January 1805. 

Between 21 and 23 August Lady Forbes survived the  1806 Great Coastal hurricane. She was part of the Jamaica fleet, 109 merchantmen plus escorts, returning to England. Of the 109 vessels, by October five vessels of the 109 in the convoy were still unaccounted for, though only 13 were known to have sunk. The seventy crew on the vessels known to have been lost were drowned. 

On 25 January 1811, Lady Forbes, of Leith, Nelson, master, was driven ashore at Annotto Bay, Jamaica. After she unloaded part of her cargo she was gotten off without any damage.

Captain M'Vicar died at Morrant Bay. Captain William Wight acquired a letter of marque on 19 December 1811. He acquired a second one on 1 December 1812.

On 2 February 1817, pirates in two schooners boarded Lady Forbes off San Domingo. They plundered her of her firearms, cutlasses, and powder. She was on her way from Jamaica to Leith.

On 12 September 1817, Lady Forbes, Marjoribanks, master, arrived at New York City from Leith, with passengers. From New York she sailed on to Jamaica.

In 1819, Hurry & Co. purchased Lady Forbes, which became a northern whale fishery whaler sailing out of Liverpool. That year she was the only whaler operating out of Liverpool. In 1820, Baffin and James joined her. The whaling season lasted from February–March to July-October. Between whaling seasons, Lady Forbes sailed to Archangel or New Brunswick. In 1819 and 1820, Lady Forbes hunted whales in the waters off Greenland. In 1821, Captain William Manger replaced Captain Robertson; under Manger, Lady Forbes hunted whales in Davis Strait.

Another source reports that in 1821, Lady Forbes had boiled 200 tons of oil.

Fate
Ice crushed Lady Forbes on 26 June 1822, while she was whaling in Davis Strait. Her crew was saved.

The day before, several vessels were made fast to ice flows at 72°5'N. The next day a small channel opened.  managed to get through. Lady Forbes tried, but the ice came back, crushing her. Her crew barely had time to save their clothes. On her on Sunday he raised the Bethel Flag, the first time it had been raised in Davis Strait, and conducted a prayer service for the seamen from all the nearby whalers.

Lady Forbes was one of seven whalers lost that year.

Notes

Citations

References
 
 
 
 

1799 ships
Ships built in Leith
Age of Sail merchant ships of England
Piracy
Whaling ships
Maritime incidents in June 1822